The county of Worcestershire is divided into six districts. The districts of Worcestershire are Worcester, Malvern Hills, Wyre Forest, Bromsgrove, Redditch, and Wychavon.

As there are 322 Grade I listed buildings in the county they have been split into separate lists for each district.

 Grade II* listed buildings in Worcester
 Grade II* listed buildings in Malvern Hills (district)
 Grade II* listed buildings in Wyre Forest (district)
 Grade II* listed buildings in Bromsgrove (district)
 Grade II* listed buildings in Redditch
 Grade II* listed buildings in Wychavon

See also
 Grade I listed buildings in Worcestershire

 
Lists of listed buildings in Worcestershire